Det var en gång is the Norwegian language and Swedish language equivalence of the expression once upon a time.

Det var en gång may refer to:
Det var en gang (film), 1994 Norwegian animated film directed by Ketil Jakobsen
"Det var en gang" song by Mabelin during Melodi Grand Prix Junior 2002 competition
"Det var en gång en fågel", song by Laser Inc on their album Roger That!
"Ett gammalt fult och elakt troll det var en gång", also known in short title "Det var en gång", traditional Swedish children's song

See also
Il était une fois (disambiguation)
Once Upon a Time (disambiguation)

sv:Det var en gång